The Dietrich Cabin is a log cabin located in Ottawa City Park in Ottawa, Kansas. Jacob Dietrich, a German immigrant, built the cabin in 1859. The cabin replaced the family's original home, which was built in 1857, and burned down the following year. After Dietrich died in 1863, his wife Catherine maintained the cabin while raising their three sons. The cabin later became a farmhouse, and several rooms were added to it. In 1961, the cabin was restored to its original condition. It is now a pioneer museum operated by the Franklin County Historical Society, and is open to the public on Sunday afternoons in the summer.

The cabin is one of the few surviving examples in Kansas of a pioneer log cabin, an important building type in both the settlement and architectural history of the state.

The cabin was added to the National Register of Historic Places on February 23, 1972.

References

External links
Dietrich Cabin - Franklin County Historical Society 

Houses on the National Register of Historic Places in Kansas
Houses completed in 1859
Houses in Franklin County, Kansas
Log cabins in the United States
Museums in Franklin County, Kansas
Historic house museums in Kansas
National Register of Historic Places in Franklin County, Kansas
Log buildings and structures on the National Register of Historic Places in Kansas
Buildings and structures in Ottawa, Kansas